Duncansby is a ghost town in Issaquena County, Mississippi, United States.

Duncansby was located on a stretch of the Mississippi River known as Duncansby Chute.

History
In 1844, nearby Skipwith became the first county seat. In 1848, the county seat was moved to Duncansby. Later that year, the county seat was moved to Tallula.

During the 19th century, the town erected dikes to reduce river flooding.

In 1900, Duncansby had two churches, and a population of 157. A post office operated from 1874 to 1919.

The U.S. Army Corps of Engineers began construction of the Sarah Cutoff in 1935, which created Old River Chute, an oxbow lake, and removed Duncansby from the contiguous Mississippi River.

Nothing remains of the former community.

References

Former populated places in Issaquena County, Mississippi
Mississippi populated places on the Mississippi River
Former populated places in Mississippi